The 2022 Shelbourne F.C. season is the club's 127th season in existence and their first back in the League of Ireland Premier Division following promotion from the League of Ireland First Division in 2021.

First team squad

 Players' ages are as of the opening day of the 2022 season.

Transfers

Transfers in

Loans in

Transfers out

Pre-season and friendlies

Competitions

Overview

League of Ireland

Results summary

Results by matchday

Matches

FAI Cup

Matches

Statistics

Appearances and goals

 Players listed in italics left the club mid-season
Source: RedsStats1895

Goalscorers 
As of match played 13 November 2022

Players listed in italics left the club mid-season
Source: RedsStats1985

Discipline 
As of match played 13 November 2022

 Players listed in italics left the club mid-season.
 Source: RedsStats1895

Kit

The 2022 home shirt was released on 10 December 2021. The away shirt was released on 8 February 2022 with the names of 2021 season ticket holders, staff and volunteers featured in the pattern.

|
|

Key: H = Home, A = Away, N = Neutral

Overview

Pre season
Damien Duff was announced as manager for the 2022 season on 3 November 2021. Defender Ally Gilchrist was announced as a new signing for Cork City on 5 November 2021 on the same day that striker Michael O'Connor was released after one season at Tolka Park. 2021 Player of the Season Ryan Brennan departed the club on 15 November 2021, and Joey O'Brien was announced as a member of Duff's backroom team. The departures of Georgie Poynton and Dayle Rooney were announced on 19 November 2021, while the re-signings of Luke Byrne and JJ Lunney for the new season were announced on 24 November 2021. Brendan Clarke and JR Wilson signed for a further season on 25 November 2021, and Shane Farrell and Stanley Anaebonam re-signed on 26 November 2021 Yoyo Madhy also re-signed for 2022 on 27 November 2021 as Denzil Fernandez announced his departure from the club (subsequently signing for Treaty United).

The first new signing of the season was announced on 27 November 2021 with striker Sean Boyd making the switch from Finn Harps. Ex-Bohemian Jack Moylan joined the club on 29 November 2021 after a successful loan period with Wexford at the end of 2021. Goalkeeper Jack Brady departed to join Treaty United on 2 December 2021, while Shane Griffin joined from St Patricks on 3 December 2021 and Brian McManus re-signed on 4 December 2021 . Kameron Ledwidge signed for another season on 5 December and midfielder Mark Coyle signed from Finn Harps on 6 December 2021. Defender Kevin O'Connor left Shels to return to Cork City while Conor Kane joined from Drogheda United on 15 December 2021. 2021 Under 17's Player of the Year Jad Hakiki signed his first professional contract with the club on 17 December 2021

Welsh forward Daniel Hawkins signed on 19 December 2021 after a season with Finn Harps, and midfielder Aodh Dervin signed from Longford Town on 26 December 2021. The departure of Yasine En-Neyah was confirmed on 3 January 2022 as the midfielder teamed up with ex-Shels manager Ian Morris at Waterford. Gavin Molloy, David Toure and Colm Cox were confirmed as being retained on 3 January 2022. Defender Aaron O'Driscoll joined from EFL League Two side Mansfield Town following a successful loan period at Longford Town in 2021. Maxim Kouogan was announced as a new signing for National League North side York City on 12 January 2022, while forward Sean McSweeney signed from Treaty United on 13 January 2022. 20 year old goalkeeper Lewis Webb joined on loan from EFL Championship side Swansea City on 15 January 2022 for an undisclosed period.

Having signed for the 2022 season in November, the club announced that Yoyo Mahdy had departed to join Finn Harps on 20 January 2022. UCD announced the signing of Alex Nolan on 21 January 2022, and Eric Molloy announced via his Twitter feed on 22 January 2022 that he had departed the club before joining Longford Town. Striker Daniel Carr signed on 2 February 2022 following a short spell with Welling United. Jordan McEneff joined on loan until June 2022 from English Premier League side Arsenal on 7 February 2022. New Zealander Adam Thomas was signed on 15 February 2022 after training with the squad during the close season, and defender Michael Barker was confirmed as having joined Longford Town on 17 February 2022

Main Season
Hours before the season opener against St Patrick's Athletic it was announced that Shelbourne had met with the Dublin City Council to propose purchasing Tolka Park and redeveloping it into a multi sport stadium. A sell out crowd of 4,100 at Tolka Park saw 9 new players line up for Shels with Luke Byrne and John Ross Wilson the only starters from the 2021 squad. In a game broadcast live on RTÉ, Shelbourne scored in the 2nd minute only to have the goal ruled for offside. Two stray passes led to goals for St Pat's, and a third goal in the 85th minute secured their win. Dan Hawkins and Mark Coyle scored the first goals of the season away to Drogheda United to give Shels their first win. This was followed by a 0–0 draw at UCD in a game that was stopped for 8 minutes due to the pitch sprinklers coming on mid game. Shels returned to Tolka Park for the fixture against Derry City but a 73rd-minute goal for the visitors saw Derry leave as victors. The remainder of March saw Shels draw 1-1 with both Dundalk and Bohemians before losing 0-3 at home to bottom club Finn Harps ahead of the first season break.

Shelbourne returned from the break with a convincing away win over Sligo Rovers, but their search for a home win continued after defeats to Shamrock Rovers and Bohemians. A further away win over league leaders Derry was followed by   losses to Dundalk and Finn Harps, leaving Shels finishing the month in 8th position. On 5 May Dublin City Council recommended abandoning plans to rezone Tolka Park for residential use in a huge boost for the club. Shels welcomed Sligo Rovers the following day and ran out 2-1 winners with a first goal for Jack Moylan and a fourth of the season for Sean Boyd securing the win. It was the start of a run of four wins following Duff's three game touchline ban after being sent off during the Drogheda. A defeat away to Shamrock Rovers saw Shels retain their 6th position in the league table on the same day that Shane Farrell signed a contract extension which secured his services for the 2023 season. Lewis Webb was recalled to his parent club Swansea City during the mid-season break which was extended with the postponement of the home fixture against Derry City due to International call ups. Jordan McEneff also returned to his parent club in the same week as Welsh goalkeeper Scott Van Der Sluis joined and JJ Lunney extended his contract until 2023. 17 year old Gavin Hodgins made his debut off the bench as Shels failed to capitalise on Ciaran Kelly's sending off in a 0-1 defeat away to Bohemian's.  An improved performance 7 days later saw Shels draw 0-0 with 2nd placed Dundalk. Jad Hakiki's services were secured with a contract extension until 2024 on 30 June 2022, with Brian McManus being signed to 2023 soon afterAn away defeat to Sligo Rovers was followed by 3-1 win at home over Finn Harps, helping the team maintain 7th position in the league.

Premier Division safety was confirmed following the 1-1 draw away to Finn Harps on 30 September 2022, as Stephan Negru scored his first senior goal on his first senior start for the team.

Shels finished the season with just 3 wins from their final 19 league games. A 2-0 away win to UCD and a 6-0 rout to Drogheda in the second last game of the year.

References

External links

 
Shelbourne
Shelbourne F.C. seasons
Shelbourne